Landis Blair (born Peter Landis Blair; 4 September 1983) is an American illustrator and comics artist. He illustrated the graphic novel The Hunting Accident and later wrote and illustrated The Envious Siblings and Other Morbid Nursery Rhymes. He is also known for his work with Caitlin Doughty and as a member of The Order of the Good Death.

Work
Blair's heavily crosshatched drawings and dark storytelling are influenced by Edward Gorey. The New York Times referred to his work on The Hunting Accident as drawn with "a graphomaniacal fervor".

Books
Landis Blair came to prominence in 2017 with his 420 pages of illustration for The Hunting Accident: A True Story of Crime and Poetry, written by David Carlson. The same year saw the publication of Caitlin Doughty's second book, From Here to Eternity, illustrated by Blair.

He both wrote and illustrated The Envious Siblings for publication by Norton in 2019.

Blair also writes and publishes some of his own books under the publishing label Sastergoodment Press.

Exhibitions
 Muskegon Museum of Art. Undying Traditions: Memento Mori at Muskegon Museum of Art, Group show, 2019.
 Indiana University Northwest. The Hunting Accident: First Chapter, Original artwork from the graphic novel, Solo show, 2019.
 Northern Illinois University. Mirth and Mayhem: Landis Blair Selections of Drawings and Books, 2021.

Other work
The foyer of an Art Deco apartment building in downtown Memphis contains an etched glass site-specific work by Landis Blair. It depicts a map of Memphis, historic locations, and the history of the building.

His illustrations have appeared in print and online magazines and have been used for commercial art such as t-shirt and tote bag designs.

Awards and honors
 2012 Grand Prize winner of The New Yorker'''s Eustace Tilley contest.
 2018 Best in Adult Books at the inaugural Excellence in Graphic Literature awards for The Hunting Accident (with David L. Carlson).
2020 Quai des Bulles prize for The Hunting Accident.2021 Fauve d'Or prize at the 2021 Festival international de la bande dessinée d'Angoulême for The Hunting Accident (with David L. Carlson).
2021 Grand prix des lectrices de Elle (with David L. Carlson) four The Hunting Accident''.

Personal life
Landis rides a unicycle.

References

External links

1983 births
American illustrators
Artists from Chicago
Living people
People from Waukegan, Illinois
School of the Art Institute of Chicago alumni
Unicyclists